Jeffrey Dunne (14 May 1956 – 14 September 2020) was an Australian rules footballer who played 102 games for St Kilda and Richmond in the top tier Victorian Football League during the 1970s and 1980s. Recruited from the North Ballarat Football Club in the Ballarat Football League, he played for St Kilda as a hard running back pocket and later represented Victoria in State of Origin matches. He won the club's best and fairest award in 1979 and 1980. He went on to coach East Launceston and North Launceston in the Tasmanian Football league in the mid 1980s.

Dunne died of a heart attack in September 2020, aged 64.

References

External links
 Bio at Saints Hall of Fame
 
 

Trevor Barker Award winners
St Kilda Football Club players
Richmond Football Club players
1956 births
2020 deaths
Australian rules footballers from Ballarat
North Launceston Football Club coaches